The House of Stenkil was a dynasty on the Swedish throne from c. 1060 to c. 1125. Stenkil probably originated from Västergötland.

Line (of magnates and earls) before Stenkil, according to the Norse sagas:
Skagul Toste (took Danegeld in England and was the father of Sigrid the Haughty)
Ulf Tostesson, the son of Skagul Toste
Ragnvald Ulfsson, the son of Ulf Tostesson, and exiled to Staraja Ladoga by Olof Skötkonung

On the throne of Sweden or Västergötland:
1060–1066 : Stenkil
1067–1070 : Halsten Stenkilsson (Halsten), son of Stenkil
1079–1084 : Inge the Elder (Inge den äldre), son of Stenkil
1084–1087 : Blot-Sweyn (Blot-Sven), possibly brother-in-law of Inge I the Elder
1087–1110 : Inge the Elder (Inge den äldre), 2nd time, restored
1110–1118 : Philip (Filip Halstensson), no children
1110–1125 : Inge the Younger (Inge den yngre), no children

Cognatic offshoots:
 c. 1125 – c 1130 Magnus I of Gothenland (the regnal list published by the royal court of Sweden includes him as a member of Stenkil dynasty), was son of Inge the Elder's daughter
 c. 1150 – 1160 Eric IX of Sweden who was married with Christina, according to Norse legends daughter's daughter of Inge the Elder; this couple started the dynasty of Eric
(* c. 1155 – 1167 Charles VII of Sweden (his mother was the widow of Inge the Younger) who married Kirsten Stigsdatter, according to Norse legends daughter's daughter's daughter of Inge the Elder; Charles belonged to the c 1130 ascended dynasty of Sverker)
 1160–61 Magnus (II) of Sweden (the regnal list published by the royal court of Sweden includes him as a member of Stenkil dynasty; some tend to call him as the "last" monarch of the House of Stenkil which however is a genealogically debatable concept), was the son of a daughter of Inge the Elder's son Ragvald.

Footnotes

External links